The 1973 Florida State Seminoles football team represented Florida State University in the 1973 NCAA Division I football season.

Schedule

Roster

Season summary

Miami (FL)

at Florida

References

Florida State
Florida State Seminoles football seasons
College football winless seasons
Florida State Seminoles football